The Mitsubishi MC-1 was a 1920s Japanese single-engined biplane airliner designed and built by the  Mitsubishi Aircraft Company.

Design and development
In 1927, the Japanese Department of Communications launched a competition to design and build an indigenous passenger transport aircraft. Mitsubishi's design to meet this requirement was based on its Mitsubishi B1M torpedo bomber, using the wings of the earlier aircraft combined with a new fuselage. The MC-1 was large three-bay biplane powered by a  Armstrong Siddeley Jaguar radial engine and it had an open cockpit behind the wings for the pilot and room for four (some sources say eight) passengers in an enclosed cabin in the forward fuselage. The MC-1 had a fixed conventional landing gear but could also be fitted with twin floats.

The MC-1 was completed in April 1928, and was evaluated against the other two competitors, the Aichi AB-1 and Nakajima N-36, both of which were also biplanes.  No production followed of any of the aircraft, as they were considered obsolete compared with foreign types, and the state-owned airline Japan Air Transport (Nihon Koko Yuso KK) ordered Fokker Universal monoplanes instead.

Operational history
Although no production of the MC-1 followed, the prototype was used to operate an experimental air service between Tokyo and Osaka sponsored by the Asahi Shimbun newspaper between June 1928 and April 1929, and then by Japan Air Transport for services in Korea until May 1930.  It was then used as a seaplane flying sightseeing flights around the north coast of Honshu until 1938.

Specifications (Landplane)

See also

References

Notes

Bibliography

MC-01
1920s Japanese airliners
Single-engined tractor aircraft
Biplanes